The 1978 Los Angeles Rams season was the team's 41st year with the National Football League and the 33rd season in Los Angeles. They improved on their 10–4 record from last year and finished 12–4.

The Rams won their sixth straight division title and appeared in the NFC Championship game, losing 28–0 at home to the Dallas Cowboys.

Offseason 
Chuck Knox, who had coached the Rams for the previous five seasons, left the team after the 1977 season to join the Buffalo Bills.

In February, 1978, Rams owner Carroll Rosenbloom hired former Rams coach George Allen, with much media fanfare. Allen had coached the Rams from 1966–1970, and had recently been dismissed by the Washington Redskins, whom he had coached from 1971–1977.

His second stint as the Rams' head coach was an unfortunate experience for all concerned. Allen did not have full authority over personnel and thus worked with general manager Don Klosterman to oversee a talented roster that had made the team a perennial playoff challenger. Allen brought with him his scrupulous discipline and attention to detail, which extended to practice-field protocol and dining-hall decorum. Almost immediately, a group of Ram players chafed at the regulations, and some made their grievances public. A few, including standout linebacker Isiah Robertson, briefly left camp.

As newspaper reports were quoting players expressing confidence that differences would be resolved, the Rams played listlessly and lost the first two games of the 1978 exhibition schedule. Rosenbloom decided that for the season to be salvaged a change must be made, and the announcement of Allen's abrupt dismissal was made on August 13, 1978, just weeks before the season opener. Many of Allen's own players were surprised by the decision. Defensive coordinator Ray Malavasi, well-respected and liked by players (and the only holdover from Chuck Knox' staff), replaced Allen.

On Tuesday, July 25, 1978, the Rams announced plans to leave the Coliseum for Anaheim Stadium beginning with the 1980 season.

NFL Draft

Roster

Regular season

Schedule

Game Summaries

Week 6 vs. San Francisco 
TV Network: CBS
Announcers: Lindsey Nelson and Paul Hornung
Pat Haden threw a pair of touchdown passes, one from 3 yards to John Cappelletti and the other from 11 yards to Wayne Miller helped the Rams stay unbeaten and spoiled the Los Angeles Memorial Coliseum return of O.J. Simpson. It was a penalty-filled game typical of those 2 teams. Simpson all he did was rushed for 83 yards on 20 carries and caught 4 passes for 30 yards. Frank Corral booted two field goals from 47 and 38 yards while the 49ers' Ray Wersching kicked a 25-yard field goal. Steve Deberg hit only 7 of 26 passes for 83 yards and missed on a fourth-down pass from the Rams' two late in the game.

Standings

Postseason

NFC Divisional Playoff 
 Los Angeles Rams 34, Minnesota Vikings 10

at Los Angeles Memorial Coliseum, Los Angeles

 TV: CBS
 Attendance: 69,631

After the game was tied 10–10 at halftime, the Rams dominated the second half by scoring 24 unanswered points. After the Vikings opened up the scoring with a field goal, Los Angeles marched 59 yards to score on quarterback Pat Haden's 9-yard touchdown pass to Willie Miller.

NFC Championship Game 
 Dallas Cowboys 28, Los Angeles Rams 0

at Los Angeles Memorial Coliseum, Los Angeles

 TV announcers (CBS): Pat Summerall and Tom Brookshier
 Referee: Ben Dreith
 Attendance: 67,470

This game was a tough defensive struggle until Charlie Waters intercepted two Pat Haden passes intended for tight end Terry Nelson. Waters' first interception came in the middle of the third and led to a 5-yard touchdown run by Tony Dorsett. Rams kicker Frank Corrall missed two first half field goal attempts, and with the score 14–0, the Rams were stopped on 4th and inches at the Dallas 21 yard line. Roger Staubach then led a touchdown drive that ended with a touchdown pass to Billy Joe Dupree. Thomas Henderson, who had said in pre-game interviews that the Rams "didn't have enough class to go to the Super Bowl", backed up his words by capping the scoring with a 68-yard interception return touchdown.

References 

Los Angeles Rams
Los Angeles Rams seasons
NFC West championship seasons
Los Angeles Rams